This article concerns the period 569 BC – 560 BC.

Events and trends
569 BC—The 24th Jain Tirthankara, Mahavira, takes Diksha.
568 BC—Amtalqa succeeds his brother Aspelta as king of Kush.
567 BC—Former pharaoh Apries invades Egypt with Babylonian help but is defeated by Saite pharaoh Amasis II (also known as Ahmose II).
25 May, 567 BC—Servius Tullius, king of Rome, celebrates a triumph for his victory over the Etruscans.
566 BC—The first known Panathenaic Games of Ancient Greece are held in Athens.
562 BC—Amel-Marduk succeeds Nebuchadnezzar II as king of Babylon.
561 BC—All eight planets of the Solar System as well as the dwarf planet Pluto fall into planetary alignment.
561 BC/560 BC—Croesus becomes king of Lydia.
560 BC—Neriglissar succeeds Amel-Marduk as king of Babylon.
560 BC—An aristocrat named Pisistratus seizes the Acropolis of Athens and declares himself tyrant. He is deposed in the same year.
c. 560 BC—The statue known as The Calf Bearer (Moschophoros), from the Acropolis, Athens, is completed.

Significant people
564 BC—Death of Aesop, Greek fable-teller
April 563 BC—Birth of Siddhartha Gautama, later known as Gautama Buddha, in Lumbini, Nepal
563 BC—Death of Queen Maya, mother of Siddhartha Gautama
562 BC—Death of Nebuchadnezzar, king of the Neo-Babylonian Empire
561 BC—Death of Jehoiachin, the nineteenth king of Judah who reigned for 3 months.
560 BC—Death of King Gong of Chu, Chinese king of Chu

References